Patrick John Freiermuth (born October 25, 1998) is an American football tight end for the Pittsburgh Steelers of the National Football League (NFL). He played college football at Penn State and was drafted by the Steelers in the second round of the 2021 NFL Draft.

High school career
A longtime resident of Merrimac, Massachusetts, Freiermuth attended Pentucket Regional High School in West Newbury, Massachusetts, before transferring to the Brooks School in North Andover, Massachusetts. At Brooks, he played tight end and outside linebacker on the football team, wearing jersey number eight. He also played basketball there as a power forward and a small forward. During his career, he had 1,531 total yards and 24 total touchdowns. He committed to Penn State University to play college football.

College career
As a freshman for the Nittany Lions in 2018, Freiermuth made nine starts and recorded 26 receptions for 368 yards and eight touchdowns, breaking the record of most receiving touchdowns by a freshman tight end. He remained the starter for the next two seasons, was voted Penn State Football's Most Valuable Offensive Player in 2019, and was invited to the NFL Draft Combine a year earlier. Although rumor said he would jump at this, he declined this chance, and in a press conference with Coach James Franklin announced that he had planned to recommit to Penn State for yet another year. He played in a total of 30 games there, and started all but four of them. He scored sixteen career touchdowns, tied for eighth place overall at Penn State for career touchdowns and first place by a tight end. In the end, he had a total of 92 career receptions, 1,185 career receiving yards, and he was named the Big Ten Conference's Kwalick–Clark Tight End of the Year in 2020, making him the first ever Penn State tight end to win this award. He was also voted first-team All-Big Ten by the coaches, and finished the season leading the conference for most receiving yards by a tight end.

Professional career 

Freiermuth was drafted in the second round (55th overall) of the 2021 NFL Draft by the Pittsburgh Steelers to replace tight end Vance McDonald, who retired after the 2020 season. He signed a four-year rookie contract with Pittsburgh on May 25, 2021. Freiermuth started his first NFL game in Week 1 against the Buffalo Bills and recorded his first career reception for 24 yards. During the season, Freiermuth sustained two concussions. The first happened in Week 12 during a 41–10 loss to the Cincinnati Bengals. The second concussion was sustained in a 19–13 win over the Tennessee Titans in Week 15. He finished the season with 60 receptions for 497 yards and seven touchdowns.

NFL career statistics

Regular season

Postseason

Personal life
Pat Freiermuth is not the only one in his family involved in athletics. Freiermuth's uncle, Michael Foley, is the offensive line coach for the University of Massachusetts Amherst. Prior to this, he was head football coach at Colgate University. His father, John Freiermuth, played basketball at St. Anselm College in New Hampshire and in 1988 he was named New Hampshire's "Mr. Basketball." His mom is a history teacher and former coach (fifteen seasons) for North Andover High School field hockey. She retired from coaching in 2007 after leading her team to two North sectional titles and a 147–85–66 record. She was also president of the Penn State Parents Football Parents Association. Tim Freiermuth, Patrick's brother, was an offensive lineman for the Springfield College of Massachusetts

References

External links
Penn State Nittany Lions bio

1998 births
Living people
People from Merrimac, Massachusetts
Sportspeople from Essex County, Massachusetts
Players of American football from Massachusetts
American football tight ends
Penn State Nittany Lions football players
Pittsburgh Steelers players